Gravesend, Rosherville and Northfleet Tramways operated a tramway service between Gravesend, Kent and Northfleet between 1883 and 1901.

History

Services started on 15 June 1883 on a horse-drawn tramway from Leather Bottle, Northfleet to Wellington Street, Gravesend running at half-hour intervals.

Closure

In 1901 the company was taken over by the Gravesend and Northfleet Electric Tramways, a subsidiary of British Electric Traction.

References

Tram transport in England
History of Gravesend, Kent
3 ft 6 in gauge railways in England